The Dog Who Saved Christmas Vacation is a 2010 American made-for-television Christmas comedy film and a sequel to the ABC Family 2009 movie The Dog Who Saved Christmas. The movie stars Paris Hilton in her first voice role, as the poodle Bella, and Mario Lopez again voices Zeus.  It premiered on ABC Family on November 28, 2010 during the Countdown to 25 Days of Christmas programming block and was written by Michael Ciminera and Richard Gnolfo.

Plot
The Bannister family and their dog Zeus go to a ski lodge in Colorado for their Christmas vacation. When they get to their condo, they find Belinda Bannister's brother and his son staying in the same condo. Along with the boys is a poodle named Bella, and Zeus immediately has a crush on her. Despite the surprised guests there, George tries to have the best Christmas ever.

Meanwhile, Ted and Stewey are after London James's necklace. They steal it, but they accidentally leave it at the gift shop, where George (thinking it's a $5 dog collar) lets Zeus buy it for Bella. Ted and Stewey kidnap Bella, so Zeus goes after her, following the two crooks to their hotel room. Ted and Stewey go to get Chinese food as Zeus enters  to save Bella. Zeus starts to set up booby traps. Stewey and Ted come back and end up chasing Zeus through the house and through booby traps. Zeus frees Bella and the two try to escape but get caught by the two robbers. Zeus and Bella finally escape with the help of Trooper, a service dog who had a crush on Bella, and used to bully Zeus. Zeus and Bella end up getting chased back to the village by Ted and Stewey. Zeus then finishes the thieves off by knocking down a tower of Christmas presents. The family finds the dogs at the village. London James gets her necklace back, Ted and Stewey are arrested, and Zeus and Bella become a couple.

Cast
 Mario Lopez as Zeus 
 Paris Hilton as Bella 
 Elisa Donovan as Belinda Bannister
 Gary Valentine as George Bannister
 Dean Cain as Ted Stein
 Joey Diaz as Stewey McMann
 Brennan Bailey as Ben Bannister
 Kayley Stallings as Kara Bannister
 Carlson Young as London James
 Michael Healey as Trooper/rescue dog

See also
 List of Christmas films

References

External links 
 

American Christmas films
ABC Family original films
Films set in Colorado
Films about dogs
Films about vacationing
2010 television films
2010 films
Films directed by Michael Feifer
Television sequel films
Christmas television films
2010s Christmas films
American sequel films